Ed Humenik (born June 29, 1959) is an American professional golfer who played on the PGA Tour and the Nationwide Tour.

Humenik joined the PGA Tour in 1989, gaining his Tour card through qualifying school. After struggling on his rookie year on Tour, he joined the Nationwide Tour in 1990. He won two events, the Ben Hogan Macon Open and the Ben Hogan Santa Rosa Open en route to a 5th-place finish on the money list which earned him his PGA Tour card for 1991. In 1991, he finished 121st on the money list, just good enough to retain his Tour card, he recorded two top-10 finishes. He bettered his performance in 1992, finishing 100th on the money list, including finishing in a tie for fourth at the Buick Southern Open. He finished 105th on the money list in 1993 and recorded three top-10 finishes. In 1994 he finished 108th on the money list, with the highlight of his year coming at the Greater Greensboro Open where he finished in a tie for second. He did not do as well in 1995 and failed to retain his Tour card. He did not play full-time on Tour again until 1999 when he played on the Nationwide Tour, his final season on Tour. He played in the U.S. Senior Open in 2009 and missed the cut.

Professional wins (3)

Ben Hogan Tour wins (2)

Other wins (1)
1988 Michigan Open

Results in major championships

CUT = missed the half-way cut
"T" = tied
Note: Humenik only played in the U.S. Open.

See also
1988 PGA Tour Qualifying School graduates
1990 Ben Hogan Tour graduates

External links

American male golfers
Michigan Wolverines men's golfers
PGA Tour golfers
Korn Ferry Tour graduates
Golfers from Detroit
1959 births
Living people